The Fall Line Trail (FLT) is an approximately 43 mile
 multi-use trail currently under development — from a northern terminus in Ashland, Virginia to a southern terminus in Petersburg, Virginia.  

Early in its development, the trail had been identified as the Ashland to Petersburg Trail (ATP), and was formally renamed when the state of Virginia broke ground on the trail in October, 2020. Anticipated to serve as a recreational and commuter spine for Central Virginia, the trail has no formal scheduled completion date, as of mid-2021. 

Running roughly north-south, the trail is projected to cross Chesterfield, Hanover and Henrico counties, the cities of Colonial Heights, Petersburg and Richmond, and the Town of Ashland — and will cross the Chickahominy, the James and Appomattox Rivers.

Connectivity and design
Depending on the final corridor, the trail is projected to connect 24 public schools, four colleges and universities, two community colleges as well as the 3.2 mile Appomattox River Trail near Petersburg. In the city of Richmond, the trail is projected to directly cross the Richmond Canal Walk and the 52 mile, roughly east-west, Williamsburg-to-Richmond Virginia Capital Trail (VCT).  In other localities it will connect existing and planned infrastructure, including the Ashland Trolley Line Trail, Chester Linear Park, Trolley Line Connector (Henrico), Brook Road protected bike lanes (Richmond), and the Northern Jefferson Davis Special Area Plan (Chesterfield). At the James River, the trail may cross at the T. Tyler Potterfield Memorial Bridge, a former dam that reopened in 2016 as a predominantly pedestrian bridge.

In contrast to the Virginia Capital Trail, which traverses largely rural areas, the Fall Line is projected to follow a route through urban, suburban, and rural landscapes. Like the Capital Trail, extensive wayfinding and signage will identify the trail and it is also projected to include a protected separation from motor vehicles.

Development
The trails earliest advocates included Bike Walk RVA, an organization that worked with the officials, municipal staff, other advocates, and volunteers to advance the concept. Subsequently, the trail has developed as a collaborative effort in cooperation with the Virginia Department of Transportation (VDOT), the seven localities, the Crater Planning District Commission, and PlanRVA. In February 2020, VDOT published its study report, identifying stakeholders, case studies of multi-use trails, six possible alignments as well as the preferred corridor for the proposed trail. 

As of early 2021, the trail had received approximately $5.7 million in state funding, with a projected cost in the range of $106-192 million (reported variously).  and funding coming from transportation funds, local jurisdictions, regional funding and form the Central Virginia Transportation Authority. The trail is projected to cost approximately three times the cost of the Virginia Capital Trail.

See also
Cycling infrastructure
Rail trail
List of rail trails
High Bridge Trail State Park
New River Trail State Park
Greenbrier River Trail
Virginia Capital Trail
Virginia Creeper Trail
Washington & Old Dominion Trail

External links 
 Interactive Map for the FLT preferred corridor
 Placeholder website for the forthcoming Fall Line Trail
 VDOT Ashland to Petersburg Study Report
 VDOT 2019 Planning Study Presentation

References

Rail trails in Virginia
National Recreation Trails in Virginia
Bike paths in Virginia